Bhararisain is the summer capital of the Indian state of Uttarakhand. It is located in Chamoli district's Gairsain tehsil, around 14 km from the town of Gairsain.

History 
On Uttarakhand's statehood, some activists considered Gairsain an ideal location for the capital of the new state. But Dehradun became the temporary capital. V. N. Dixit commission, set up to decide the location of a permanent capital, rejected Gairsain as too prone to earthquakes. In 2012, due to local demands, then Chief Minister of Uttarakhand Vijay Bahuguna held cabinet meetings in Gairsain and started construction of an assembly building in Bhararisain.

Vidhan Sabha complex 
Covering , the assembly building is estimated to have cost ₹150 crores. In the summer, officials travel from Dehradun along with documents to Bhararisain for the assembly session. Complex is kept closed during the snowy winters.

References

Uttarakhand
Indian capital cities
Cities and towns in Chamoli district
States and territories established in 2000
2020 establishments in India